is a small asteroid and near-Earth object of the Apollo group, approximately  in diameter. It was first observed on 18 January 2018, by astronomers of the Catalina Sky Survey at Mount Lemmon Observatory, Arizona, United States, just hours before passing about 0.10 lunar distances of the Earth.

Orbit and classification 

2018 BD is an Apollo asteroid. It orbits the Sun at a distance of 0.75–1.36 AU once every 13 months (395 days; semi-major axis of 1.05 AU). Its orbit has an eccentricity of 0.29 and an inclination of 2° with respect to the ecliptic.

2018 approach

Physical characteristics 

Based on a generic magnitude-to-diameter conversion,  measures between 2 and 6 meters in diameter, for an absolute magnitude of 30.154, and an assumed albedo between 0.05 and 0.20, which represent typical values for carbonaceous and a bright E-type asteroids, respectively. As of 2018, no rotational lightcurve of this object has been obtained from photometric observations. The body's rotation period, pole and shape remain unknown.

Numbering and naming 

This minor planet has neither been numbered nor named.

References

See also
 List of asteroid close approaches to Earth in 2018

External links 
 Flyby diagram of 2018 BD, Minor Planet Center
 Asteroid 2018 BD missed Earth by just 0.10 LD on January 18, The Watchers, 18 January 2018
 A new asteroid was discovered just seven hours before cruising past Earth, BGR.com, 19 January 2018
 
 

Minor planet object articles (unnumbered)
Discoveries by the Catalina Sky Survey
Near-Earth objects in 2018
20180118